Dawn is the time that marks the beginning of the twilight before sunrise.

Dawn may also refer to:
 Dawn (name), a given name, including a list of people with the name

Places
 Dawn, Missouri, an unincorporated community in the United States
 Dawn, Ohio, an unincorporated community in the United States
 Dawn, Texas, an unincorporated community in the United States
 Dawn (PAT station), a station on the Port Authority of Allegheny County's light rail network
 1618 Dawn, an asteroid
 Dawn Township, Ontario, Canada, today part of Dawn-Euphemia Township. There is also a community in the township called Dawn.

Organisations
 Dawn (Iceland), an Icelandic political organization formed in 2012
 Dawn (Slovakia), a Slovakian political party formed in 2005
 Dawn – National Coalition, a Czech political party
 Dawn (Bengali educational society), a society founded in 1902
 Dawn Bible Students Association, an American organization established in 1932
 Dawn Career Institute, a technical school in Wilmington, Delaware, US
 Dawn Equipment Company, a manufacturer of agricultural equipment
 Dawn Foods, an American food manufacturer and distributor
 Development Alternatives with Women for a New Era (DAWN), a transnational network of feminists from the global South
 Democracy for the Arab World Now, a Washington-based Middle East human rights and democracy advocacy non-profit

Products
 Dawn (brand), a dishwashing detergent by Procter & Gamble
 Dawn doll, a fashion doll by Topper between 1970 and 1973

Vehicles
 Akatsuki (spacecraft) or Dawn, a Japanese spacecraft launched in 2010 to Venus
 Dawn (spacecraft), a space orbiter launched in 2007 to Vesta and Ceres
 USS Dawn (1857), a steamer
 USS Dawn (SP-26), a repair boat in commission from 1917 to 1918
 USS Dawn (SP-37), a proposed private yawl ordered delivered to the Navy in 1917 but never commissioned into Navy service
 USS Dawn (IX-186), a tanker in commission from 1944 to 1946
 Rolls-Royce Dawn, a handmade 2+2 convertible luxury grand tourer automobile

Art
 Dawn (Journeay), a 1971 bronze sculpture by Helen Journeay in Houston, Texas, US
 Dawn (Michelangelo), a marble sculpture in Florence, Italy
 Dawn (painting), a 1989 painting by Odd Nerdrum

Books and publications

Books
 Dawn, the Al-Falaq invocation, the 113th Sura of the Qur'an
 Dawn (Andrews novel), a 1990 novel by V. C. Andrews and Andrew Neiderman
 Dawn (McLaughlin novel), a 1980 novel by Dean McLaughlin
 Dawn (Rider Haggard novel), an 1884 novel by H. Rider Haggard
 Dawn (Warriors), 2006 novel in the Warriors: The New Prophecy series by Erin Hunter
 Breaking Dawn (Meyer novel), a 2008 novel by Stephenie Meyer
 Dawn (Wiesel novel), a 1961 short novel by Elie Wiesel
 Dawn (Wright novel), a 1929 novel by S. Fowler Wright
 Dawn (Demirtaş book), a 2017 short story collection by Selahattin Demirtaş 
 Dawn (comics), a comic book series and the title character
 Dawn, a novel by Octavia E. Butler, part of the Xenogenesis Trilogy
 Dawn, a novel by Kevin Brooks

Magazines and newspapers
 Dawn Media Group, a Pakistani media company
 Dawn (newspaper), a Pakistan English-language newspaper
 Dawn News, an English-language news channel in Pakistan
 Dawn (magazine), an Australian magazine
 Dawn (Indian educationalist magazine), a magazine published between 1897 and 1912
 The Dawn (feminist magazine), an Australian literary journal
 The Dawn (feminist newsletter), a non-party political journal published in Western Australia
  The Dawn (magazine), a periodical by the Dawn Bible Students Association

Film and television
Dawn (1919 film), adapted from the Eleanor Porter story of the same name
 Dawn (1928 film), a British silent film
 Dawn (1929 film), a German silent film
The Dawn (film) (1936), an Irish film
 Dawn: Portrait of a Teenage Runaway, a 1976 American made-for-television movie
Dawn of the Dead (1978 film), a zombie horror film directed by George Romero
Dawn of the Dead (2004 film), a 2004 remake of the 1978 film
 Dawn!, a 1979 biopic of Dawn Fraser
Red Dawn (1984 film), an American war film starring Patrick Swayze and Charlie Sheen
Red Dawn (2012 film), a 2012 remake of the 1984 film
 Dawn (1985 film), a Franco-Hungarian film
Rescue Dawn (2006 film), an American film starring Christian Bale
 Dawn (2014 film), a Swiss film
Dawn of the Planet of the Apes (2014 film), an American science fiction film.
 Dawn (2015 film), a Latvian film
 "Dawn" (Star Trek: Enterprise), an episode of Star Trek: Enterprise
 Dawn, a documentary series presented by Dawn Porter
 Dawn, an anime character in Pokémon

Music
 Dawn Records, a 1970s British record label launched by Pye Records
 Tony Orlando and Dawn (also known as "Dawn"), a pop music group from the 1970s
 Dawn (Swedish band), a Swedish black metal band
 The Dawn (band), a Filipino rock band
 Dawn (rapper), a South Korean rapper and singer

Albums
 Dawn (Aimer album), 2015
 Dawn (Current 93 album), 1987
 Dawn (Danger Danger album), 1995
 Dawn (Dawn Robinson album), 2002
 Dawn (Eloy album), 1976
 Dawn (Gary Numan album) or Sacrifice, 1994
 Dawn (Guitar Vader album), 2003
 Dawn (Mxmtoon EP), 2020
 Dawn (Mount Eerie album), 2008
 Dawn (Rebecca St. James EP), 2020
 Dawn (Yebba album), 2021
 The Dawn (album), by The Dawn, 1986

Classical
 "Dawn", also known as "Sunrise", the introduction to Also sprach Zarathustra by Richard Strauss

Songs
 "Dawn (Go Away)", a 1964 song by The Four Seasons
 "Dawn", a 1996 song by Stabbing Westward from Wither Blister Burn & Peel
 "Dawn", a 2001 song by Bif Naked from Purge (album)
 "Dawn: Dawn Is a Feeling", a 1967 song by The Moody Blues from Days of Future Passed
 "Dawn (LiSA song)", a 2021 song by LiSA

See also
 The Dawn of Day, an 1881 philosophical book by Friedrich Nietzsche
 Drug Abuse Warning Network (DAWN), a US government program to collect statistics on emergency room mentions of drugs
 Hellsing: The Dawn, a prequel of the manga Hellsing
 Madaling Araw ("Dawn"), a 1909 Philippine novel by Iñigo Ed. Regalado
 Operation Dawn (disambiguation), various military operations 
 De Vrije Gedachte or The Dawn, a Dutch freethinkers association